Asano (written: 浅野,  or hiragana あさの) is a Japanese language surname. Notable people with the surname include:

Asano clan, samurai family in feudal Japan.
Asano Naganori, Important historical figure title: Takumi no Kami
Asano Nagaakira, samurai
Asano Nagamasa, samurai
Asano Nagakoto, last daimyō
Asano Yukinaga, samurai
Asano Naganao, Edo period daimyō
Asano Nagatomo, Edo period daimyō
Aiko Asano, actress and singer
Atsuko Asano, actress
Atsuko Asano (writer)
, Japanese male volleyball player
Inio Asano, manga artist
Kevin Asano, retired judoka from the United States
Koji Asano, musician and composer
Masumi Asano, voice actress
Mayumi Asano, voice actress
, Japanese swimmer
Rin Asano, manga artist of Deaimon
Shirō Asano (professor), Japanese professor and political commentator
Sōichirō Asano, businessman
Tadanobu Asano, actor
Takuma Asano, footballer
, Japanese daimyō
, Japanese footballer

Fictional characters
Rin Asano, a character from Blade of the Immortal

See also
Asano-gumi, yakuza (criminal) gang based in Okayama, Japan

References

Japanese-language surnames